interosseous nerve may refer to:

 Anterior interosseous nerve, a branch of the median nerve that supplies the deep muscles on the anterior of the forearm
 Anterior interosseous syndrome or Kiloh-Nevin syndrome I is a medical condition in which damage to the anterior interosseous nerve
 Deep branch of radial nerve, also known by the Latin term nervus interosseus dorsalis 
 Posterior interosseous nerve, or dorsal interosseous nerve, is a nerve in the forearm